Boleszewo  is a village in the administrative district of Gmina Sławno, within Sławno County, West Pomeranian Voivodeship, in north-western Poland.

Before 1648 the area was part of Duchy of Pomerania, 1648–1945 Prussia and Germany. For the history of the region, see History of Pomerania.

The village has a population of 466.

References

Boleszewo